Friedkin is a surname. Notable people with the surname include:

Amy Friedkin (born 1947), president of the American Israel Public Affairs Committee (AIPAC)
Anthony Friedkin (born 1949), American photographer
Dan Friedkin (born 1965), American billionaire
Jay Friedkin, film editor
Kenny Friedkin (1915-1962), American aviator and businessman
Thomas H. Friedkin (1935-2017), American billionaire businessman
William Friedkin (born 1935), American film director, producer and screenwriter